The Western Premier League is a regional Australian association football league, comprising teams from the Central West region of New South Wales. The competition is run under the Western NSW Football body, an associate of Football NSW - a member federation of Football Australia.  It fits below the national A-League and NSW wide divisions including National Premier Leagues NSW, being level 5 league in the Australian league system.

History
The Western Premier League was founded in 1994 as the Central West Soccer League, with East Dubbo United taking out the inaugural championship, defeating Bathurst 75 on penalties 4–3 in the grand final, after the score was locked at 2-all at the end of extra-time.

The competition ran from 1994 until the end of 2012 before collapsing after Westside Panthers and Dubbo Bulls all pulled out in quick succession, leaving just three teams in the competition. The competition was later revived ahead of the 2020 season, with nine teams initially entering the first WPL season in eight years, later reduced to seven teams by July when the season commenced after a delay caused by the COVID-19 pandemic.

Format
As of the 2023 season, the competition consists of nine teams from around the Central West region of New South Wales. Each team will play each other twice, to form a 18-round, round robin format. The current finals format is yet to be determined, but it will concluded with a grand final to determine the champion, usually held at the ground of the highest-ranked team.

Current clubs and location
The following clubs will participate in the 2023 Western Premier League:

Former clubs

Grand final results

Performance by club

There are seven clubs who have won the Western Premier League title.

Teams in bold compete in the Western Premier League as of the 2022 season.

Lower grades

Reserve Grade

Under 18s

References

External links
New South Wales Premier League
Oz Football NSW Statistics
Weltfussballarchiv

1